C. mitchelli may refer to:
 Charaxes mitchelli, a butterfly species in the genus Charaxes
 Crotalus mitchellii, a snake species
 Ctenus mitchelli, Gertsch, 1971, a spider species in the genus Ctenus and the family Ctenidae found in Mexico

See also
 Mitchellii